Georgi Stoichkov (born 27 May 1994) is a Bulgarian footballer who plays as a midfielder for Bulgarian Third League club Balkan Botevgrad.

References

External links

Living people
1994 births
Bulgarian footballers
Association football midfielders
FC Vitosha Bistritsa players
FC Botev Vratsa players
FC Pirin Razlog players
FC Septemvri Sofia players
FC Hebar Pazardzhik players
First Professional Football League (Bulgaria) players
Footballers from Sofia